Jared William Homan (born March 6, 1983) is an American professional basketball player who last played for Maccabi Ashdod of the Israeli Premier League. His natural position is power forward, but he is also an accomplished center.

Player profile
A pre-draft review of Homan stated: "Jared Homan isn't quite a household name yet, but he has a very intriguing package of size, skill, and mentality that has certainly piqued the interest of NBA scouts. Playing in a college basketball conference known for its rugged, physical play, Homan threw his body around with the best of them. He is noted for never passing or passing up a shot and for not backing down."

Professional career
Homan signed with the Greek League club Maroussi in 2009. In July 2010, he signed with Virtus Bologna. In November 2011 he signed with Bayern Munich after he was waived by Virtus Bologna because he allegedly punched the coach. In September 2013, he signed a one-year deal with Spartak Saint Petersburg.

In October 2014, he signed with Eskişehir Basket of Turkey.

National team career
Homan was a member of the senior men's Bulgarian national basketball team.

Career stats 

Source:  – See For Comprehensive Stats

References

External links 
 Euroleague.net Profile
 Draftexpress.com Profile

1983 births
Living people
ABA League players
American expatriate basketball people in Croatia
American expatriate basketball people in Germany
American expatriate basketball people in Greece
American expatriate basketball people in Poland
American expatriate basketball people in Israel
American expatriate basketball people in Russia
American expatriate basketball people in South Korea
American expatriate basketball people in Turkey
Basketball players from Iowa
BC Spartak Saint Petersburg players
Bulgarian men's basketball players
Centers (basketball)
Eskişehir Basket players
FC Bayern Munich basketball players
Goyang Carrot Jumpers players
Greek Basket League players
Iowa State Cyclones men's basketball players
KK Cibona players
Maccabi Ashdod B.C. players
Maroussi B.C. players
Mersin Büyükşehir Belediyesi S.K. players
Power forwards (basketball)
Virtus Bologna players
American men's basketball players